

Kim Il-sung Square is a large city square in the Central District of Pyongyang, North Korea, and is named after the country's founding leader, Kim Il-sung. The square was constructed in 1954 according to a master plan for reconstructing the capital after the destruction of the Korean War. It was opened in August 1954. The square is located on the foot of the Namsan Hill, west bank of the Taedong River, directly opposite the Juche Tower on the other side of the river. It is the 37th largest square in the world, having an area of about 75,000 square metres (807,293 square feet) which can accommodate a rally of more than 100,000 people.  The square has a great cultural significance, as it is a common gathering place for rallies, dances and military parades and is often featured in media concerning North Korea.

Overview
The Kim Il-sung Square is at the centre of Pyongyang on the west bank of the Taedong River. It is similar in form and design to the Tiananmen Square in Beijing and is used for the same purposes. Since the completion of the square, multiple parades have been held to commemorate many different events and also to show the world the military capabilities of North Korea. The Kim Il-sung Square is architecturally more refined with its dramatic riverside setting. If an observer stands in the square, the Tower of the Juche Idea on the opposite bank appears to be located directly towards the west end of the square, although it is actually across the Taedong River, as with the Workers' Party Monument and the Mansudae Grand Monument. This optical effect is created because the square is a few meters lower in the centre when compared to the side near the Taedong River. Surrounding the square are a number of government buildings, with the Great People's Study House located at the east end of the square. 

Portraits of Karl Marx and Vladimir Lenin once hung on one of the buildings surrounding the square, but were taken down sometime in 2012. During Kim Jong-il's rule, only Kim Il-sung hung on these buildings, although his portrait on the building below the flag of the DPRK was removed. When Kim Jong-il died, his portrait was added to the buildings in commemoration. At the south end are two flag poles which were installed in 2013 for use in national events.

The old ceremonial grandstand on the square's south side was renovated in 2020.

Under the square, there is a department store selling products such as toys.

Kim Il-sung Square is the "kilometre zero" of North Korea from where all national road distances are measured.

Removal of anti-American imperialism propaganda 

After the Singapore Trump-Kim summit in 2018, North Korea removed the anti-American imperialism propaganda in Kim Il-Sung Square. Also, North Korea cancelled the annual ‘anti-US’ rally event in 2018. In 2017, the protests that were held in Kim Il-sung Square were supposedly attended by 100,000 people. Furthermore,  North Korea issued special anti-US postage stamps in 2017.

References

Further reading

External links

360° Interactive panorama of Kim Il-sung Square at night images
Asian Historical Architecture: Kim Il-sung Square
Traveller's blog with pictures from North Korea ; Several photos of Kim Il Sung Square
Kim Il-sung Square, Pyongyang, North Korea (video) — practising for the Mass games

Squares in North Korea
Geography of Pyongyang
National squares
Kim Il-sung
1954 establishments in North Korea
Buildings and structures completed in 1954
20th-century architecture in North Korea